Ratchet is the 2015 debut studio album by American singer/songwriter Shamir, released on May 19, 2015, on XL Recordings.

The debut single from the album, "Call It Off", was released in March 2015 while the album itself was released on May 19, 2015. The music video for "Call It Off" was produced and released as part of the 2015 YouTube Music Awards.

The album's second single, "Darker", was released in May 2015.

"On the Regular" is also included on the album.

Accolades

Track listing

Vegas (4:16)
Make A Scene (2:52)
On The Regular (2:58)
Call It Off (2:50)
Hot Mess (4:29)
Demon (3:40)
In For The Kill (3:18)
Youth (4:38)
Darker (3:58)
Head In The Clouds (5:02) 
KC (Bonus) (3:47)

Writing and composition
The first single, 'Call It Off', describes a toxic relationship between the writer and an unknown person. The song is outlined by 'acid' basslines and rises up to hectic synth lines.

References

External links

2015 debut albums
Shamir (musician) albums
XL Recordings albums
Hip house albums